Side midfielder in football (soccer) is a player who plays on the side of the midfield. The more common term for this is wide midfielder or winger.

 For the main article on the midfield position, see midfielder
 For the article on wingers, see winger (sport)